HD 75116, also known as HR 3491, is a solitary, orange hued star in the southern circumpolar constellation Volans, the flying fish. It has an apparent magnitude of 6.31, placing it near the limit for naked eye visibility. Parallax measurements from the Gaia spacecraft place the star relatively far at a distance of 930 light years.

This is a red giant with a spectral classification of K3 III:, but there is uncertainty behind the class. Gaia Data Release 3 stellar evolution models place it on the red giant branch. It has 2.29 times the Sun’s mass but has expanded to 52.2 times its girth. It rotates slowly like many giant stars, having a projected rotational velocity .

References 

K-type giants
075116
3491
042850
CD-67 00666
Volans (constellation)
Volantis, 40